The Dominican Republic first participated in the Olympic Games in 1964,  when Alberto Torres de la Mota ("El Gringo" ) participated in the 10th heat of the 100m competition and ran 10.9 seconds, finishing 6th, not qualifying for the next round.

The Dominican Republic has appeared in every one of the games since then. The Dominican Republic has never participated at the Winter Olympic Games.

The Dominican Republic has won ten medals at the Olympics. Pedro Nolasco won a bronze in boxing at the 1984 Summer Olympics and in 2004 Félix Sánchez won a gold in the 400 meter hurdles. In the 2008 Summer Olympics Manuel Felix Diaz won a gold medal in Boxing and Gabriel Mercedes won silver in Taekwondo. At the 2012 Summer Olympics in London, Sanchez once again won a gold medal in the 400 meter hurdles. On the same night, Luguelín Santos won silver in the 400 metres to become the youngest ever Olympic medallist in the event. Luisito Pie won a bronze medal in Taekwondo at the 2016 Olympics in Rio de Janeiro.

They are represented by Dominican Republic Olympic Committee.

Medal tables

Medals by Summer Games

Medals by sport

List of medalists

See also
 List of flag bearers for the Dominican Republic at the Olympics
 Dominican Republic at the Paralympics

References

External links